Deer Park High School can refer to:
 Deer Park Junior/Senior High School in Ohio
 Deer Park High School (New York), Deer Park, New York, on Long Island
 Deer Park High School (Texas)
 Deer Park High School (Washington State)